Air Hawaii was a scheduled passenger airline providing service between Honolulu and the U.S. West Coast cities of Los Angeles and San Francisco. The airline advertised its service as "High Class. Low Fares." Founded by Michael J. Hartley, who previously started The Hawaii Express and would later co-found CheapTickets, Air Hawaii began operations between Honolulu and Los Angeles on November 22, 1985, and added service between San Francisco in December. The airline almost immediately ran into financial problems and discontinued operations on February 19, 1986.

There were also two other airlines which used the name Air Hawaii respectively in 1968 and 1981 with both air carriers operating inter-island commuter flights in Hawaii with small turboprop and prop aircraft.

Destinations
Air Hawaii served three destinations in the United States:
 Honolulu (Honolulu International Airport - HNL)
 Los Angeles (Los Angeles International Airport - LAX)
 San Francisco (San Francisco International Airport - SFO)

Fleet
Air Hawaii operated two McDonnell Douglas DC-10-10 aircraft. Both of these planes had previously operated for Michael Hartley's previous venture, The Hawaii Express.
 N904WA cn/ln: 46930/112 delivered: 13 January 1986 
 N905WA cn/ln: 46938/153 delivered: 20 November 1985

See also
 List of defunct airlines of the United States

References

 
 
 
 
 In Re Airwest International, Inc., Dba Air Hawaii, Debtor.wyman W.c. Lai, Trustee for Airwest International, Inc., Dbaair Hawaii, Plaintiff-appellee, v. International Air Leases Inc., a Delaware Corporation;world Airways, Inc., a Delaware Corporation,defendants-appellants

External links

 Air Hawaii DC-10 Photo at Airliners.net
 Air Hawaii DC-10 Postage Stamp Image at Hawai'i Post

Airlines disestablished in 1986
Airlines established in 1985
Companies based in Honolulu
Defunct airlines of the United States
Defunct companies based in Hawaii
1985 establishments in Hawaii
1986 disestablishments in Hawaii